André Hanssen (born 31 January 1981 in Tromsø) is a former Norwegian footballer. His former teams are SC Heerenveen and FK Bodø/Glimt.

He received two knee operations in the 2007/08 season to repair damaged cartilages. He returned to training in January 2009, and played half a game for the reserve team on 2 February 2009, and left Heerenveen that summer when his contract was not renewed. On 10 August 2009, he returned to his former Bodø/Glimt, signing a short term contract for the remainder of the season.

On 3 March 2010, Hanssen signed a three-year contract with Strømsgodset IF. He played regularly in the 2010 season, but re-injured his knee and spent the next two seasons almost entirely on the injured list. Because of the persistent injuries, he announced his retirement in June 2012.

Career statistics

Honours
KNVB Cup: 1
 2009

Stromsgodset IF 
Norwegian Football Cup:
 2010

References

External links 
 

1981 births
Living people
Norwegian footballers
FK Bodø/Glimt players
SC Heerenveen players
Eliteserien players
Eredivisie players
Norwegian expatriate footballers
Expatriate footballers in the Netherlands
Norwegian expatriate sportspeople in the Netherlands
Sportspeople from Tromsø
Association football midfielders
SC Heerenveen non-playing staff